SAMG Entertainment is a South Korean animation studio.

Productions
  (2010)
  (2014–2015; co-production with Choirock)
 Power Battle Watch Car (2016; co-production with Hyundai Motor Company and Innocean Worldwide)
 Monkart: Legend of Monster Kart (2017–2018)
 Miniforce X (2017–2018)
 Miniforce X: Pentatron (2018–2019)
Miniforce: Super Dino Power (2019–2020)
Catch! Teenieping (2020–present)Miniforce: Animaltron (2021-2022)
Miniforce V (2022-present) {Officially announced - yet to be aired)

Animation services and international co-productions

  (2005; co-production with PMMP, Timoon Animation, SOVIK and Pictak)
  (2009; co-production with PMMP and Timoon Animation) 
 Monk Little Dog (2011; co-production with Timoon Animation and Kim's Licensing)
  (2011; co-production with Timoon Animation, Hawaii Animation Studio and Cyber Group Studios)
 Sonic Boom (2014; animation services for SEGA, OuiDo! Productions and Lagardère Thematiques)
 Miraculous: Tales of Ladybug & Cat Noir (2015–present; co-production with Zagtoon, Method Animation and Toei Animation) 
 Zak Storm (2016–2017, 2020–present; co-production with Zagtoon, Method Animation and Man of Action)
 Ghostforce''

Continuous Series

Miniforce 

 Miniforce: New Heroes Rise - 2014 (Movie)
 Miniforce (Series) Season 1 - 2015 to 2016 (Co-production with Choirock)
 Miniforce (Series) Season 2 - 2016 to 2017
 Miniforce X - 2017 to 2018
 Miniforce X Pentatron - 2018 to 2019
 Miniforce X: Deeno the King of Dinosaurs - 2019 (Movie)
 Miniforce: Super Dino Power Season 1 - 2019 to 2020
 Miniforce Super Dino Power: Hamburger Attack - 2020 (Movie)
 Miniforce: Super Dino Power Season 2 - 2020 to 2021
 Miniforce Animaltron - 2021 to 2022
 Miniforce V - 2022 to present (Official Announced - Yet to be aired)

Miraculous: Tales of Ladybug & Cat Noir 

 Miraculous Ladybug : Season 1 (produced & broadcast on EBS)
 Miraculous Ladybug : Season 2 (produced & broadcast on EBS)
 Miraculous Ladybug : Season 3 (produced & broadcast on EBS)
 Miraculous Ladybug : Season 4 (animated)
 Miraculous Ladybug : Season 5 (animated)

Movies 

 Miniforce : The New Heroes Rise (2014)
 Power Battle Watch Car : Feature Film (2018)
 Miniforce X : Deeno the King of Dinosaurs(2019)
 Miniforce Super Dino Power : Hamburger Attack (2020)

References
2.SAMG animation is still active and working on Miraculous project.

External links
 

South Korean animation studios